Second Spring is a Turkish television series, broadcast between 1998-2001 by ATV. First 8 episodes appeared between 29 October 1998 – 20 May 1999 (with some reruns). The next 15 episodes were between 17 February-25 May 2000 and the last 14 episodes were between 21 September 2000 – 11 January 2001. There were also reruns; in 2007 by Fox TV and in 2011-2012 by Star TV.

The name of the series

In Turkish, the phrase "Second Spring" refers to middle age romance. The main characters in the series, Ali Haydar and Hanım as well as the main antagonists Vakkas and Neriman are middle age characters. But there are young characters too. For example, Ali Haydar has three daughters, Hanım has a daughter and a son.

Plot 

The scene is a market place in Samatya neighbourhood of İstanbul. There are a number of stories interrelated to each other. Ali Haydar, a widower,  is a kebap restaurant owner. (Kebap is grilled meat) Hanım, also a widow, is his female meze cook (Meze is a group of small dishes served during the meal).  Ali Haydar soon falls in love with Hanım. But the situation is complicated, because his landlady Neriman an ex-actress whom Ali Haydar is in dept, too wants to marry Ali Haydar. Another problem of Ali Haydar is Vakkas, the owner of a rival restaurant whose father was Ali Haydar's tutor. Vakkas tries everything to ruin Ali Haydar with financial plots. While the fathers are struggling, Ali Haydar's elder daughter Melek and Vakkas' son Medet are secretly planning to marry. Cennet, Ali Haydar’s second daughter decides not to show up in her graduation ball because she doesn’t know how to dance. But Tim, a tourist working as an aide in Haydar's restaurant volunteers to teach her how to dance. Hanım has different problems. Her daughter Gülsüm who has an affair with a wealthy man, gets pregnant and her son Ulaş is planning to migrate to United States illegally. Meanwhile, Secaattin (Şeco for short), Neriman's brother, a zabıta (municipal police) whom all shopkeepers hate, is trying to fix problems with his ex-wife (who is his superior in the office) and his son.

Cast

There are more than 30 characters. The important ones are as follows.

Gallery

Trivia 
In 1998 Şener Şen and Türkay Şoray were already well known stars. But the series promoted artists who played some of the young characters such as Nurgül Yeşilçay, Ozan Güven and Devin Özgür Çınar. Also Özkan Uğur who was known as a music star and Tan Sağtürk who was known as a ballet made names as the new faces in Turkish film industry.

Notes

References

Turkish drama television series
1998 Turkish television series debuts
2001 Turkish television series endings
1990s Turkish television series
2000s Turkish television series
ATV (Turkey) original programming
Fatih